The Inter Baku 2007–08 season was Inter Baku's seventh Azerbaijan Premier League season, and their second season under manager Valentin Khodukin. They finished won the league on goal difference over Olimpik Baku and where runners-up in the Cup.

Squad

Transfers

Summer

In:

Out:

Winter

In:

Out:

Competitions

Azerbaijan Premier League

Results

Table

Azerbaijan Cup

Final

Squad statistics

Appearances and goals

|-
|colspan="14"|Players who appeared for Inter Baku and left during the season:

|}

Goal scorers

Notes
Qarabağ have played their home games at the Tofiq Bahramov Stadium since 1993 due to the ongoing situation in Quzanlı.

References

External links 
 Inter Baku at Soccerway.com

Shamakhi FK seasons
Inter Baku